Obe (Owbi, Obeh) is a town and the administrative center of Obe District, Herat Province, Afghanistan.

Climate
Obe features a hot-summer humid continental climate (Köppen climate classification: Dsa). Precipitation is low, and mostly falls in spring and winter.

References

See also
Herat Province

Populated places in Herat Province